Tri-Valley High School, located in Dresden, Ohio, is the high school for the Tri-Valley Local School District, a public school district encompassing northwest and north central Muskingum County, Ohio.

Athletics

Ohio High School Athletic Association State Championships

 Boys Basketball – 1963*, 1964*  
 * Titles won by Jefferson High School prior to consolidation in 1966.
 * State runner-up title earned by Frazeysburg High School in 1960.
Wrestling-Kade Kowalski- 2013 DI 145LBS Champion
As of November 2014 the Tri-Valley High School boys soccer team has held the MVL (Muskingum Valley League) title for fourteen consecutive years, from 2000 to 2013.

The Tri-Valley High School Marching Band has qualified for OMEA State Competition for 38 consecutive seasons.
(Marching band also got a superior at state for the 2019 season)

The Tri-Valley 2017 Football team was the state runner-up for the 2017 OHSAA MVL Season.

Notes and references

External links
 District Website

High schools in Muskingum County, Ohio
Public high schools in Ohio